Ste. Rose du Lac, Manitoba, Canada.

References

Defunct airports in Manitoba